Starmer is a surname. Notable people by that name include:

 Aaron Starmer (born 1976), American author
 Clement Starmer (1895–1978), English cricketer
 Keir Starmer (born 1962), British barrister and Member of Parliament, Leader of the UK Labour Party and Leader of the Opposition since 2020
 Nigel Starmer-Smith (born 1944), English rugby union player, journalist and commentator
 Walter Percival Starmer, (1877-1961), artist
 William Austin Starmer, sheet music cover artist
 William T. Starmer, American geneticist and Professor

See also

 Starner (surname)
 Sthamer (surname)
 Stahmer (surname)